The Guanzhong dialect is a dialect of Central Plains Mandarin spoken in Shaanxi's Guanzhong region, including the prefecture-level city of Xi'an. Since people from Xi'an are considered the prototypical Guanzhong speakers, the Guanzhong dialect is sometimes referred to as Shaanxihua or Xi'anhua. 

During the Western Zhou Dynasty, the Guanzhong dialect was called "Yayan", or the 'elegant dialect'. The Book of Poetry records that "the Shang King was not elegant, but the elegant were free from Zhou." The Guanzhong dialect was once the official language of the four dynasties of Zhou, Qin, Han and Tang. The unification pattern of the Han Dynasty and the great integration of nationalities promoted the Xi'an dialect to influence dialects all over the country, which reached its peak during the Tang Dynasty.

However, the dialects spoken in northern and southern Shaanxi differ from that of Guanzhong, such as the Hanzhong dialect, which is more closely related to Sichuanese Mandarin. 

In general, the Guanzhong dialect can be classified into two sub-dialects: the Xifu dialect, or the 'dialect of the western prefectures', which is spoken in the west of Xi'an, in Baoji of Shaanxi Province; Tianshui, Qingyang, Pingliang, Longnan of Gansu Province; and south of Guyuan of Ningxia Province, and the Dongfu dialect, or the 'dialect of the eastern prefectures', spoken in Xi'an, Weinan, Tongchuan, Xianyang and Shangluo of Shaanxi Province. 

Due to the prevalence of Standard Mandarin in urban areas such as Xi'an, the younger generations prefer Mandarin or Shaanxi Mandarin, which is essentially Mandarin with the tone changes typical of the Guanzhong dialect. Due to the lexical and grammatical similarities between Northern Mandarin dialects, attrition of these dialects is more serious. Authorities have moved in to document the local dialects to preserve them.

See also
Qinqiang

Citations

References

Mandarin Chinese